Khalifah Al-Ammari (Arabic:خليفة العماري) (born 31 January 1990) is a Qatari footballer. He currently plays as a goalkeeper  .

External links
 

Qatari footballers
1990 births
Living people
Al Sadd SC players
Lekhwiya SC players
Al-Sailiya SC players
Al-Rayyan SC players
Al-Shamal SC players
Al-Shahania SC players
Qatar Stars League players
Qatari Second Division players
Association football goalkeepers